Acacia manipularis is a shrub of the genus Acacia and the subgenus Plurinerves that is endemic to north western Australia.

Description
Like most species of Acacia it has phyllodes rather than true leaves. The evergreen phyllodes growing in clusters of two to six per node and have threadlike appearance and are straight to slightly curved. It blooms in July and produces yellow flowers.

Taxonomy
The species was first formally described by the botanists Richard Sumner Cowan and Bruce Maslin in 1995 as a part of the work  Acacia Miscellany. Miscellaneous taxa of northern and eastern Australia of Acacia section Plurinerves (Leguminosae: Mimosoideae) as published in the journal Nuytsia. It was reclassified as Racosperma manipulare by Leslie Pedley in 2003 then transferred back to genus Acacia in 2006.

Distribution
It is native to an area in the Northern Territory and the Kimberley region of Western Australia where it is commonly situated on shale plateaux growing in rocky, skeletal soils. It has a limited range from between Mount House Station and Tableland Station where it is usually a part of tall shrubland communities associated with Eucalyptus brevifolia and species of Melaleuca.

See also
 List of Acacia species

References

manipularis
Acacias of Western Australia
Flora of the Northern Territory
Taxa named by Bruce Maslin
Plants described in 1995
Taxa named by Richard Sumner Cowan